Way Back Home is a 2013 South Korean drama film starring Jeon Do-yeon and Go Soo, and directed by Bang Eun-jin. It is based on the true story of an ordinary Korean housewife who was imprisoned in Martinique for two years after being wrongfully accused of drug smuggling at a Paris airport.

This is the first time a Korean film was shot in the Caribbean, as well as the first to feature actual guards and prisoners as supporting characters. Filming took place over three weeks at a women's prison in Martinique.

Plot
Jeong-yeon (Jeon Do-yeon) and Jong-bae (Go Soo) are a happily married couple with a young daughter; they pour their savings into an auto repair shop only to have the rug pulled out from underneath them when a friend of Jong-bae's commits suicide after he is unable to pay his loans. Since Jong-bae acted as his friend's guarantor, the debt now falls onto them. With Jong-bae gradually growing despondent following their financial turmoil, Jeong-yeon makes the hard decision to do a job for a seedy acquaintance. She agrees to deliver diamonds from Paris to Seoul, which she thought would be legal. Jeong-yeon arrives in France, but as soon as she sets foot in Orly Airport she is arrested and police discover more than 30 kilograms (66 pounds) of cocaine in her bag. Being thrown in a French jail is only the beginning of her troubles as legal wranglings and an indifferent Korean embassy in France soon see her shipped off to a penitentiary on the far-flung island of Martinique, a French territory in the Caribbean, where she is jailed for two years without being tried in court. Back in Korea, her husband does his best to get through to the diplomats and secure her passage home.

Cast

Jeon Do-yeon as Song Jeong-yeon
Go Soo as Kim Jong-bae
Ryu Tae-ho as Consul Bang
Bae Sung-woo as Section chief Chu Dae-yoon
Kang Ji-woo as Hye-rin
Joanna Kulig as Yalka 
Corinne Masiero as "Hellboy" 
Lee Dong-hwi as Gwang-sik 
Choi Min-chul as Seo Moon-do 
Heo Joon-seok as Soo-jae
Park Hyung-soo as Seoul District Prosecutors' Office detective
Park Yoon-hee as KBC TV reporter Shin Cheol-ho
Park Ji-il as Police officer Lee Soo
Lee Do-kyeong as Department head Joo 
Jean-Michel Martial as Martinique judge 
Antoine Blanquefort as Martinique prosecutor
Hugues Martel as New defense lawyer Olivier Bécourt 
Catherine Baugue as original Martinique defense lawyer
Park Ji-hwan as Ha Tae-gwang
Seo Jin-won as Sang-cheol 
Oh Yeon-ah as Lee Soo-ji 
Chae Yoo-hee as Ji-hye
Dong Hyo-hee as Jong-bae's older sister 
Marie-Philomène Nga as "250 years old"
Feliné Quezada Figueroa as "Gangster #1"
Gastner Legerme as Ducos driving prison officer 
Seo Byeong-cheol as Interrogating detective Choi Jo 
Kim Mi-kyung as landlady
Son Young-joo as YTN newsreader
Kim Seon-ju as French interpreter
Pascal Vallet as French plainclothes policeman
Kim Su-hyeon as Bang's wife
Lee Sa-bi as KBC TV writer
Kang Myeong-chan as KBC TV cameraman
Jang Gwang as Korean ambassador to France (cameo)
Kim Hae-gon as Deputy driving car owner (cameo)

Background
On 30 October 2004, Jang Mi-jeong was arrested at Orly Airport in France for smuggling a suitcase filled with 17 kilograms (or 37 pounds) of cocaine. Jang said she had no idea what it contained; she had been given a bag by her husband's friend, whom she had known for more than 10 years, and was told it was filled with unpolished gemstones. After getting caught at Orly, Jang was jailed near Paris for three months awaiting trial. Then, after being found guilty, she was sent to a prison in French-administered Martinique in the Caribbean. She finally returned to Korea two years later on 18 November 2006. Her friend was eventually arrested as well and sentenced to serve 10 years in jail. Jang's story was later featured on In Depth 60 Minutes, a KBS investigative-documentary show, in 2006. In 2013, Jang published the book Lost Days, recounting her ordeal and her life after returning from prison, particularly her difficult re-adjustment to Korean society and the ostracism she and her two daughters faced.

The Ministry of Foreign Affairs has been criticized by Jang and the filmmakers for its handling of the incident, citing their "diplomatic negligence" and calling them irresponsible when it comes to protecting Koreans abroad. Foreign Ministry officials have insisted that the story in the movie is not the whole truth.

Box office
Way Back Home was released in theaters on 11 December 2013. The film recorded 610,000 admissions on its opening weekend, placing second in box-office sales.

Awards and nominations

References

External links
 

2013 films
South Korean drama films
South Korean films based on actual events
2010s South Korean films